Leopoldo Torres Boursault (12 January 1941 – 22 June 2021) was a Spanish jurist and politician, who served as a Deputy and lawyer as Attorney General.

References

1941 births
2021 deaths
Spanish politicians
Attorneys general of Spain
Members of the 1st Congress of Deputies (Spain)
Members of the 2nd Congress of Deputies (Spain)
Members of the 3rd Congress of Deputies (Spain)
Spanish Socialist Workers' Party politicians
University of Strasbourg alumni
University of Helsinki alumni
Academic staff of the Complutense University of Madrid
People from the Province of Soria